Stanley Donen (April 13, 1924 – February 21, 2019) was an American film director and choreographer, and occasionally worked in the American theater. He has directed 28 feature films and worked on various other films or television projects, often as a choreographer. He began his career in the chorus line on Broadway for director George Abbott, where he befriended Gene Kelly. Shortly afterwards he moved to Hollywood and collaborated with Kelly on numerous films as a choreographer until they became co-directors on his feature film debut On the Town. In 1952 Donen and Kelly co-directed the musical Singin' in the Rain, regarded as one of the greatest films ever made. He went on to direct hit films for several decades thereafter, many of which are currently regarded as classics. He has won numerous awards for his life's work, most notably an Honorary Academy Award in 1998 and a Career Golden Lion from the Venice Film Festival in 2004.

Filmography

As director

As choreographer

Other Work

Stage work

References

Bibliography

 
 
 

Director filmographies